Comitas sobrinaeformis is an extinct species of sea snail, a marine gastropod mollusc in the family Pseudomelatomidae.

Description

Distribution
Fossils of this species were found  in Japan.

References

sobrinaeformis
Gastropods described in 1937